Service at Sea (Spanish: Servicio en la mar) is a 1951 Spanish war film directed by Luis Suárez de Lezo.

Cast

References

Bibliography 
 Bentley, Bernard. A Companion to Spanish Cinema. Boydell & Brewer 2008.

External links 
 

1950s war drama films
1951 films
1950s Spanish-language films
Spanish black-and-white films
Spanish Civil War films
Submarine films
Spanish war drama films
1950s Spanish films